The Spell is the fifth full-length album recorded by the indie rock band The Black Heart Procession.

The album was released by Touch and Go Records on May 9, 2006.  The album was recorded and produced by the band in their new studio, SDRL, in San Diego.  A video was made for the track "Not Just Words."

Track listing
"Tangled" – 4:13
"The Spell" – 4:39
"Not Just Words" – 4:11
"The Letter" – 4:29
"The Replacement" – 3:57
"Return to Burn" – 4:23
"GPS" – 3:34
"The Waiter #5" – 4:04
"Places" – 3:51
"The Fix" – 4:09
"To Bring You Back" – 3:39

Musicians
Tobias Nathaniel - Piano, Bass, Organ, Guitars, Tympani, Wurlitzer
Pall Jenkins - Guitars, Vocals, Bass, Organ, Synth, Lap Steel, Saw
Joe Plummer - Drums, Percussion,
Matt Resovich - Violin, Wurlitzer, Synth, Lapsteel
Jimmy LaValle - Piano, Bass, Reverb Tank, Organ

References

2006 albums
The Black Heart Procession albums
Touch and Go Records albums